Lincoln is a town in Kewaunee County, Wisconsin, United States. The population was 948 at the 2010 census. The unincorporated communities of Lincoln, Gregorville, and Euren are in the town. The unincorporated communities of Rio Creek and Rosiere are also partially in the town.

Geography
Lincoln is in northern Kewaunee County and is bordered to the north by Door County.

Demographics
As of the census of 2000, there were 957 people, 334 households, and 263 families residing in the town. The population density was 26.8 people per square mile (10.4/km2). There were 346 housing units at an average density of 9.7 per square mile (3.7/km2). The racial makeup of the town was 98.96% White, 0.10% African American, 0.10% Native American, 0.21% Asian, 0.10% from other races, and 0.52% from two or more races. Hispanic or Latino of any race were 1.25% of the population.

There were 334 households, out of which 40.4% had children under the age of 18 living with them, 69.8% were married couples living together, 5.7% had a female householder with no husband present, and 21.0% were non-families. 17.4% of all households were made up of individuals, and 10.2% had someone living alone who was 65 years of age or older. The average household size was 2.87 and the average family size was 3.23.

In the town, the population was spread out, with 28.5% under the age of 18, 7.6% from 18 to 24, 27.7% from 25 to 44, 23.0% from 45 to 64, and 13.2% who were 65 years of age or older. The median age was 36 years. For every 100 females, there were 105.8 males. For every 100 females age 18 and over, there were 107.3 males.

The median income for a household in the town was $42,188, and the median income for a family was $45,714. Males had a median income of $32,273 versus $20,417 for females. The per capita income for the town was $16,183. About 5.9% of families and 8.9% of the population were below the poverty line, including 9.7% of those under age 18 and 7.7% of those age 65 or over.

History
Lincoln is the fourth-most Belgian-American community in the United States, by proportion of population. Lincoln was originally named "GrandLez", after the village of Grand-Leez, now a section of the town of Gembloux, Arrondissement of Namur, province of Namur, Belgium (cfr :fr:Grand-Leez). Belgians emigrated from there between 1850 and 1860.

Most Belgian-American towns 
 1) Union, Door County, Wisconsin : 49%
 2) Red River, Wisconsin (Kewaunee County) : 47%
 3) Brussels, Wisconsin (Door County) : 36.4%   ( composed of "Brussels community" & "Namur Community")
 4) Lincoln, Kewaunee County, Wisconsin : 35.4%
 5) Green Bay (town), Wisconsin (Brown County) : 31.8%

References

External links
Official website

Towns in Kewaunee County, Wisconsin
Green Bay metropolitan area
Belgian-American culture in Wisconsin
Towns in Wisconsin